Chef! is a British situation comedy starring Lenny Henry that aired as twenty episodes over three series from 1993 to 1996 on the BBC. The show was created and primarily written by Peter Tilbury based on an idea from Lenny Henry and produced for the BBC by Henry's production company, Crucial Films.

Plot
Henry starred as Gareth Blackstock, a talented, arrogant, tyrannical and obsessed chef who has endlessly inventive insults for his staff, unknowing customers, and almost anyone else he encounters. Chef Blackstock's traditional French cuisine with an eclectic flair is served at "Le Château Anglais," a gourmet restaurant in the English countryside that is one of the few in the United Kingdom to receive a two-star rating from Michelin. The chef's quest for perfection and his lack of awareness about the costs of that perfection mean that the restaurant is on the brink of financial collapse when he and his wife Janice (played by Caroline Lee-Johnson) buy it early in the first series. The establishment mostly remains on that brink, despite Janice's best efforts as manager, eventually coming under the control of the boorish Cyril Bryson (Dave Hill) in the final series.

Although focused on the restaurant's kitchen, the countryside (with its black market suppliers) and the Blackstocks' home life are also backdrops for the show; the chef's long hours mean that Janice is routinely neglected in the bedroom, and their plans for a family remain delayed.

Cast

Besides Gareth and Janice Blackstock, a third character, Everton Stonehead (played by Roger Griffiths), appears throughout all three series. Stonehead went to school with the chef and dreams of becoming a top chef himself. He bumbles through his early days in the kitchen, but eventually even develops a signature dish of his own.

Production
According to Lenny Henry:
The first episode of Chef! was developed over two years, and so Peter Tilbury and I were really put through loads of hoops about character motivation. Why is this character such an arsehole? Is this the right kind of character for Lenny Henry to be playing? All that kind of stuff. Once we got through that and they greenlit the series, Peter then had something like eight or nine weeks to write the rest of it. The remaining five episodes were much easier to write because we'd had every argument about who, what, where, and how. The world had been mapped out. Actually, the very first episode of Chef! was the hardest one to watch for me because we'd worked so hard on it and you could see all the things that had been rewritten in the first episode.

Lenny Henry was coached in cooking techniques at the L'Ortolan Restaurant, in Shinfield, Reading, Berkshire. The restaurant was modelled on, and many scenes were filmed at, Le Manoir aux Quat' Saisons, a restaurant in Oxfordshire owned by chef Raymond Blanc. Many other scenes were filmed at Nether Winchendon House, in Buckinghamshire. The third series was shot at Teddington Studios in Middlesex. Celebrity chef John Burton Race acted as food consultant for the show.

The first two series were shot on film and directed in the style of a drama series, with the finished episodes shown to screening audiences. Due to budgetary and time constraints, the third series was shot with a live audience on videotape and was directed more like a traditional sitcom.

Lenny Henry stated on his website that he and Tilbury had worked on a storyline for another series, but that nothing came of it.

Episodes

Series 1 (1993)

Series 2 (1994)

Series 3 (1996)

Reception
According to the Museum of Broadcast Communications, the show was "highly critically acclaimed for its high production values, its comic-drama scripts, and its lead performances. Most of all, perhaps, the series [was] a landmark programme in the sense that Henry plays a character who just happens to be black; the fact of his blackness does not limit the narrative or the audience the series reaches."

BFI's screenonline noted that "what really marked out Chef!, however, was Henry's development as an actor. As the kitchen tyrant Gareth Blackstock, he proved himself capable of representing a multifaceted character far beyond the caricatures of his sketch shows." It also noted that Chef! "managed some acute observations on food and contemporary Britain: the celebritisation of cuisine, the pathological obsession with hygiene, the near impossibility of securing genuinely excellent produce in a culture dominated by industrial farming and supermarket giants."

Some contemporary critics were less positive, however. Reviewing the second series in the Evening Standard, Victor Lewis-Smith described it as "...not funny enough to be classed as sit-com, nor believable enough to be classed as drama, forensic science has been unable to detect any trace of humour or subtlety in this dismal hybrid".

Home release
All three series were released on Region 1 DVD on 30 August 2005. The Region 2 DVDs have been available since 2 October 2006.
Several minutes of the first series episode "The Big Cheese" were missing from the Region 2 DVD release. This was due to a mastering error; corrected replacement discs were later offered by the BBC. The Region 1 release is full and uncut.

References

External links

Chef! at British TV Comedy

1990s British sitcoms
1990s British workplace comedy television series
1993 British television series debuts
1996 British television series endings
BBC television sitcoms
Black British sitcoms
Food and drink television series
Television series about marriage
Television series set in restaurants
Television shows set in England
Television shows shot at Teddington Studios